Rurouni Kenshin: Reflection, known in Japan as , is a Japanese original video animation (OVA) which serves as a sequel to the Rurouni Kenshin anime television series, an adaptation of the manga series of the same name created by Nobuhiro Watsuki. It was produced by Studio Deen, directed by Kazuhiro Furuhashi and written by Reiko Yoshida and released in Japan from December 2001 to March 2002.

The OVA series is set both during and after the timeline of the television series and tells of Kenshin and Kaoru's later days, much of which is not derived from the Rurouni Kenshin manga. It is mostly told from the point of view of Kamiya Kaoru. The story follows Himura Kenshin as he attempts searching for ways to atone for those who died at his hands, while Kaoru waits for Kenshin to return home. Kenshin's actions, however, alienate him from his estranged son, Kenji.

Rurouni Kenshin: Reflection was originally released in North America as Samurai X: Reflection while it was being licensed by ADV Films. Rurouni Kenshin: Reflection is currently licensed by Aniplex of America for English-language releases. Reflection was released in the United States by ADV Films on DVD in March 2003, while a Director's Cut edition was later released. Rurouni Kenshin: Reflection was released on Blu-ray Disc by Aniplex of America in September 2011.

Rurouni Kenshin: Reflection received mixed reviews upon its release; critics praised the art, animation and music of the series but criticised its story and character development.

Plot
The OVA starts out as a montage of singular events surrounding the life of Kenshin Himura, told from the point of view of Kaoru Kamiya. Then the remainder of it involves Kenshin, who becomes tortured anew by the guilt of leading a happy life after such a destructive past. He makes the decision to wander again, and Kaoru strongly supports him, promising to welcome him home with a smile and their child. For fifteen years, he wanders, returning every once in a while. Kenshin eventually becomes ravaged by an unknown disease. To share his pain, Kaoru convinces Kenshin to infect her with the disease through sexual intercourse. Kenshin then leaves to go assist in the First Sino-Japanese War (primarily over control of Korea) as he had promised the Meiji Government, not fighting and killing, but instead helping people.

However, his son, Kenji, holds resentment towards Kenshin for leaving them. Now in his adolescence, he leaves for Kyoto hoping to learn Hiten Mitsurugi-Ryu fighting style from Seijuro Hiko, hoping to be as strong as his father. Soon however, Kenshin's friend Yahiko Myojin tracks him down at the request of Kaoru. Yahiko duels him to show him the delusions of achieving his father's greatness. Yahiko admits that he is a genius and has natural talent as a swordsman. In a one final strike, Yahiko lets Kenji experience the full brunt of Kenshin's Sakabatou; allowing Kenji to experience the strength of his father's philosophy firsthand. Falling to his knee, Yahiko presented Kenji with the Sakabatō as a late genpuku gift.
After the war's end, Sagara Sanosuke discovers an ill Kenshin sometime after he had fallen overboard on a ship. Sanosuke arranges Kenshin's return to Tokyo by boat. Upon arriving, a bed-ridden Kaoru, gets up to walk outside the dojo on the cherry blossom path, seeing her husband struggling with each step to meet her. The two meet, and Kenshin collapses into her arms as he clutches her to him.  Kenshin tells Kaoru that he returned for her, and Kaoru quietly greets him with his old name, Shinta, for he had asked it before he left the last time. Soon, they end up beneath a cherry blossom tree, where Kaoru tells him that they will invite everyone for a cherry blossom viewing, and continue to gather in the years to come. With the silence growing stronger, Kaoru realizes that Kenshin has died quietly in her arms. Upon brushing his hair off his left cheek, Kaoru notices Kenshin's scar has faded away, signifying that his journey of atonement is finally over. In the final scene before the credits, she holds his head in her arms and weeps.

After the credits finish rolling, there is a scene which Kenji, walking with a young girl, Chizuru, beneath the cherry blossoms, saying that they will live happily together.

Cast

Release

Rurouni Kenshin: Reflection was directed by Kazuhiro Furuhashi, with the screenplay written by Reiko Yoshida, music composed by Taku Iwasaki, and animated by Studio Deen. Its two episodes were first released on VHS and DVD by SPE Visual Works on December 19, 2001, and March 20, 2002. A "Director's Cut" DVD, which included new scenes, was released on October 9, 2002. Aniplex released the series on a Blu-ray set on September 21, 2011.

In North America, the OVA was released by A.D. Vision, under the title Samurai X: Reflection, on March 25, 2003. The Director's Cut DVD was released on December 28, 2004. Aniplex of America released the OVA on a Blu-ray set, as Rurouni Kenshin: Reflection, on September 20, 2011.

In Australia and New Zealand, Madman Entertainment released the OVA on DVD on May 14, 2003.
In the United Kingdom, A.D. Vision released the OVA on DVD on September 22, 2003.

Reception
Although Reflection was not written by Watsuki, he stated that he "checked in on the script." Watsuki mentioned not having input in it, and let the director "run wild with it." In response to Kenshin's death in comparison to the happy ending in the manga version, he felt that his own work eventually would have reached Kenshin's death had he continued writing. He had not wished to pursue that line because "Kenshin went through so much crap and deserved a happy ending." He felt that neither version was better than the other because "it's a personal taste thing."

Mike Crandol of Anime News Network gave different opinions about the OVA series. On one hand, Crandal said that the OVA series were some of the best animation ever to come out of Japan, rivaling the American masters in fluidity of motion and with a musical score to match. On the other hand, Crandol says that fans of the original story will be disappointed as there are not many fight scenes and that the character Kenshin Himura is very different from his original version; for instance, he never uses his trademark idiomatic phrase "oro?", and it is thought he never gives a "true" smile. Crandol also comments about a "tedious and depressing melodrama".  while IGN felt that some moments of the relationship between Kenshin and Kaoru were depressing. While criticizing the characters' sad decisions, Serdar Yegulalp from About.com wondered whether the OVAs had to make viewers accept Kenshin's death wish after so much time of wandering and feeling a mortal disease. However, some reviewers noted Kenshin's personality in the OVAs was one of the most complex ever to be animated remarking on the fact that he can not forget his bloody past, despite having a peaceful life. Don Houston from DVD Talk noted the controversy between the fandom as they refrained from treating Reflection as canon due to how tragic the life of Kenshin's family became. Ridwan Khan from Animefringe found that Enishi and Shishio's antagonisms against Kenshin in the original video animations were overshadowed by Kenshin's disease due to the bigger impact it has on the narrative.

References

External links

2001 anime OVAs
Rurouni Kenshin
ADV Films
Adventure anime and manga
Aniplex
Drama anime and manga
Fiction set in 1864
Kyoto in fiction
Martial arts anime and manga
OVAs based on manga
Romance anime and manga
Samurai in anime and manga
Studio Deen